Beezy Bear is a 1955 Disney animated short featuring Donald Duck, who appears as a beekeeper. This is Humphrey the Bear's fifth appearance. The cartoon portrays Humphrey as a honey-stealing bear.

Plot
While beekeeper Donald is working one morning, he catches Humphrey the bear raiding his hives in an attempt to steal some of the honey. The bees then chase Humphrey, forcing him to hide underwater in a nearby pond.

Donald complains to Ranger Woodlore, who assembles his bears and informs them of Donald's predicament.  Told that someone is stealing Mr. Duck's honey, the entire group expresses mock outrage. Humphrey, who is the last bear to arrive, is still dripping from being in the pond. When Woodlore asks him why he is always wet, and he responds by making body-washing gestures, Woodlore tells him that he bathes too much.

The Ranger then shows the bears the property boundary line between their park and Donald's honey farm.  Donald puts up a barbed wire fence to keep the bears out, but this does not stop Humphrey, who  uses a sign to prop it up. After failing twice to outsmart the bees, Humphrey uses a hose to try to obtain the honey, but Donald takes the hose and fills it with water to make look like honey running through, which squirts in his face and catapults, Humphrey, Donald and Woodlore into the pond, after which Woodlore hits him on the head and says, "You take too many baths!"

Voice cast
 Donald Duck: Clarence Nash
 Humphrey the Bear: Jimmy MacDonald
 J. Audubon Woodlore: Bill Thompson

Home media
The short was released on November 11, 2008 on Walt Disney Treasures: The Chronological Donald, Volume Four: 1951-1961.

It is also available on Disney+.

See also
In the Bag
Rugged Bear
Grin and Bear It
Bearly Asleep
Hooked Bear

References

External links
 
 

1955 films
1955 animated films
Donald Duck short films
1950s Disney animated short films
Films directed by Jack Hannah
Films produced by Walt Disney
Animated films about bears
Films scored by Oliver Wallace
CinemaScope films
1950s English-language films
1950s American films

ga:Beezy Bear